Action for Development (ACFODE) is an indigenous (Ugandan) non government Women Association founded by women academicians; Dr Joy Kwesiga, Dr Hilda Tadria and Dr Ruth Mukama with the help of Maxine Ankra with the aim of incorporating ideas discussed during the United Nations World Conference on Women held in July 1985 in Nairobi, Kenya. Uganda had been denied entry into the conference because of the prevailing political climate at the time, thus the need to start an organization that would champion women issues without government interference.

Activities 
ACFODE focuses on issues related to women empowerment in Uganda through research, capacity building, coalition building, mobilization, sensitization and advocacy for policy formulation.

It also champions the women's cause and gender equality on the national Agenda and puts emphasis on ending sexual Gender based violence and discrimination in Uganda.

ACFODE is also an advocate for good governance and democracy through monitoring and civic education. It also promotes formulation and implementation of gender responsive political, economic, and social policies and programs.

It also contributes to building and strengthening of sister civil society organizations in Uganda.

Location 
ACFODE's headquarters are found at plot 623/624 Dan Mulika close - Bukoto.

References 

Women's organisations based in Uganda
Organisations based in Kampala
Year of establishment missing
Non-governmental organizations
Women's rights in Uganda